Garfield is an unincorporated community located in Osage Township in LaSalle County, Illinois, United States, located in the panhandle of LaSalle County. It is also a part of the geographic region known as Streatorland.

Garfield is named for James A. Garfield, 20th President of the United States.

History

Unincorporated communities in LaSalle County, Illinois
Unincorporated communities in Illinois